The Great Northern Railway Class J23 was a class of  steam locomotive. They had long side tanks that came to the front of the smokebox, which sloped forwards to improve visibility and had a recess cut in to aid maintenance. Forty were built by the Great Northern Railway (GNR) between 1913 and 1922, with a further 62 being added by the London and North Eastern Railway (LNER) between 1924 and 1939. They were given the nickname "Submarines" due to their long tanks.

History
For shunting and local goods work, the Great Northern Railway (GNR) had traditionally used saddle-tank engines of the 0-6-0 wheel arrangement; the last of these, of GNR Class J13, having been built in 1909 to the designs of Henry Ivatt, the GNR Locomotive Superintendent.

Nigel Gresley succeeded Ivatt in 1911, and soon identified a need for engines to work the short-haul coal traffic in the West Riding of Yorkshire; the nature of which required that the locomotives also be suitable for shunting. He designed a new class of  engine, using side tanks instead of saddle tanks. Gresley had recently begun the rebuilding of the GNR Class L1  locomotives with larger boilers,  in diameter, which left a number of  diameter boilers spare. Thirty of these were used in the construction of the new goods tank engines between 1913 and 1919; when ten more were built in 1922, these again used secondhand boilers, but  in diameter. On the GNR, both varieties were classified J23, but the LNER divided them into J51 with smaller boilers, and J50 with larger boilers. The LNER continued the construction of Class J50, building a further 62 up to 1939, only the first ten of which were given secondhand boilers. Class J51 were rebuilt to class J50 between 1929 and 1935.

Each of the two main classes exhibited variations: locomotive brakes could be operated by vacuum or steam pressure; the driving position could be on the right- or the left-hand side of the cab; and there were three sizes of coal bunker. These variations were recognised by class subdivisions:
J51/1 10 built 1913–14, 4 ft 2 in boiler, vacuum brake, right-hand drive, short bunker
J51/2 20 built 1914–19, as J51/1 but long bunker
J50/1 10 rebuilt 1929–35 from J51/1 with 4 ft 5 in boiler
J50/2 20 built 1922–24, as J51/2 but 4 ft 5 in boiler, plus 20 rebuilt 1929–34 from J51/1 with 4 ft 5 in boiler
J50/3 38 built 1926–30, 4 ft 5 in boiler, steam brake, left-hand drive, long bunker
J50/4 14 built 1938–39, 4 ft 5 in boiler, vacuum brake, left-hand drive, long bunker with hopper

All were built at Doncaster, except the last fourteen which were built at Gorton. Further orders were placed in 1939 and 1941 totalling 25 more locomotives, but these were cancelled in 1942 after a number of components had been manufactured. Withdrawals began in 1958 with the arrival of diesel shunters and ended in 1963 for the normal stock. 7 of them survived as departmental stock until 1965. The class became extinct in September 1965 when Departmental No. 14 (ex-68961) was withdrawn and scrapped. None of them survived into preservation.

Numbering
On the GNR, the numbers were 157–164, 166–176, 178, 211–230; these were increased by 3000 by the LNER. The first ten engines built by the LNER were numbered 3231–40, following on from the GNR engines; but those built from 1926 were given scattered numbers between 583 and 636, between 1037 and 1086, and 2789–94.

In 1943, new numbers were allotted in a continuous block from 8890 to 8991; these numbers were applied between January and December 1946, but before this could be done, the oldest ten, nos. 3157–64/6/7 were temporarily renumbered 3180–9 in May and June 1945. They duly received their permanent numbers 8890–9 between June and December 1946. Under British Railways, the 1946 numbers were increased by 60000.

Notes

References

External links 

 The Gresley J50 & J51 (GNR J23) 0-6-0T Locomotives
 Class J50/1 Details at Rail UK
 Class J50/2 Details at Rail UK
 Class J50/3 Details at Rail UK

0-6-0T locomotives
J23
Railway locomotives introduced in 1913
Scrapped locomotives
Standard gauge steam locomotives of Great Britain